Timothy Brown (February 24, 1889December 31, 1977) was an American lawyer and judge from Wisconsin. He was the 18th Chief Justice of the Wisconsin Supreme Court.

Biography

Born in Madison, Wisconsin, Brown graduated from the University of Wisconsin–Madison and received his law degree from Harvard Law School. During World War I, Brown served in the United States Navy. Brown practiced law in Milwaukee, Wisconsin and served as executive counsel to the Governor of Wisconsin. In 1949, he joined the Wisconsin Supreme Court and in 1962 became chief justice of the court, retiring in 1964.

Brown died in a nursing home on December 31, 1977, leaving an estate valued at $3 million.

Notes

Politicians from Madison, Wisconsin
Politicians from Milwaukee
Military personnel from Madison, Wisconsin
University of Wisconsin–Madison alumni
Harvard Law School alumni
Chief Justices of the Wisconsin Supreme Court
1889 births
1977 deaths
20th-century American judges
Lawyers from Milwaukee
Lawyers from Madison, Wisconsin
20th-century American lawyers